Grigory Ivanovich Rossolimo ( – September 1928) was a Russian Empire and Soviet neurologist who was a native of Odessa. (He was of Greek origin; his grandfather had gone sailing from Cephalonia as a young man, been shipwrecked, and washed up near Odessa, where he remained for the rest of his life.) He specialized in the field of child neuropsychology.

Biography 
In 1884 he graduated from the University of Moscow, and subsequently worked under Aleksei Kozhevnikov (1836-1902) at the clinic of neurological diseases. He earned his medical doctorate in 1887, and in 1890 became head of the department of neurology at the clinic of Aleksei Alekseevich Ostroumov (1844-1908).

In 1911, along with other academic personnel at the University of Moscow, he resigned in protest against reactionary reforms installed by the minister of education. Afterwards, he opened his own institute of neurology and child psychology. In 1917 he returned to the university, and attained the chair of neuropathology. In this position, he established a department for child psycho-neurology and "defectology".

Rossolimo is remembered for his work in experimental psychology, research that included the development of psychological profiles. A particular study of his involved grouping children according to psycho-physiological characteristics and anomalies. 

He was co-founder of the "Korsakov Journal of Neurology and Psychiatry", a publication named in honor of Sergei Sergeievich Korsakoff (1853-1900).

Associated eponym 
 Rossolimo's reflex: Exaggerated flexion of the toes in response to percussion of the plantar surface of the second to fifth toes, and is indicative of lesions of the pyramidal tract.

Cultural mention 
Rossolimo is mentioned in Mikhail Bulgakov's story, "The Fateful Eggs".

Rossolimo was a contemporary and friend of the author Anton Chekhov, who was also a physician by training (Satran, 2005b). Chekhov's letters to Rossolimo can be found in "A life in letters" (Chekhov, A., 2004).

See also
 Ivan Bekh, professor

References 

 Grigorii Ivanovich Rossolimo @ Who Named It
 The collected works of L.S. Vygotsky, Vol. 2, p. 315 (brief bio in footnote).
 Satran, R. (2005a).  G. I. Rossolimo (1860–1928). Journal of Neurology, 252, 1423–1424
 Satran, R. (2005b). Chekhov and Rossolimo Careers in medicine and neurology in Russia 100 years ago. Neurology, 64(1), 121-127.
 Chekhov, A. (2004). A Life in Letters. (A. Phillips & R. Bartlett, Trans.). London: Penguin Classics

1860 births
1928 deaths
Soviet neurologists
People from the Russian Empire of Greek descent
Physicians from the Russian Empire
Child psychologists
Physicians from Odesa
Burials at Novodevichy Cemetery